KUSO (92.7 FM) is a radio station licensed to Albion, Nebraska, United States. The station airs a country music format and is currently owned by Flood Communications, L.L.C.

References

External links
KUSO's website

USO
Country radio stations in the United States